Crucea may refer to several places in Romania:

 Crucea, Constanța, a commune in Constanța County
 Crucea, Suceava, a commune in Suceava County
 Crucea, a village in Lungani Commune, Iași County
 Crucea de Jos and Crucea de Sus, villages administered by Panciu town, Vrancea County